Friedemann Friese (born June 5, 1970) is a German board game designer, currently residing and working in Bremen.  His trademarks are his green-colored hair and games whose titles begin with the letter "F".  The majority of his games, self-published by his company 2F-Spiele, also sport a green color scheme. He is known for his absurd and humour-themed games.  Many of his games feature artwork from game artist Harald Lieske.

Games designed 
Fertig! (also known as Finished!) (2F-Spiele) (2017)
America (with Ted Alspach) (Bezier Games) (2016)
504 (Stronghold Games) (2015)
Fremde Federn (also known as Copycat) (2F-Spiele) (2012)
Freitag (also known as Friday) (2F-Spiele) (2011)
Funkenschlag: Fabrikmanager (Power Grid: Factory Manager) (2F-Spiele) (2009)
Die 3 Gebote (also known as The 3 Commandments) (with Gordon Lamont and Fraser Lamont) (Rio Grande Games, Bewitched) (2008)
Fauna (Huch & Friends) (2008)
Filou - Die Katze im Sack (also known as Felix: The Cat in the Sack) (2007)
Monstermaler (with Marcel-André Casasola Merkle & Andrea Meyer) (2F-Spiele, Bewitched Spiele, Casasola) (2006)
Fürchterliche Feinde (Formidable Foes) (2F-Spiele) (2006) 
Fiji (2F-Spiele) (2006)
Fiese Freunde Fette Feten (with Marcel-André Casasola Merkle) (2F-Spiele) (2005)
Funkenschlag (2F-Spiele) (also known as Power Grid - Rio Grande Games) (2004)
Finstere Flure (Fearsome Floors) (2F-Spiele) (2003)
Fische Fluppen Frikadellen (2F-Spiele)
Falsche FuFFziger (2F-Spiele)
Flickwerk (2F-Spiele)
Foppen (2F-Spiele)
Friesematenten (2F-Spiele)
Frisch Fisch (2F-Spiele) (also known as Fresh Fish - Plenary Games)
Frisch Fleisch (2F-Spiele)
Fundstücke (2F-Spiele)
Ludoviel (with Hartmut Kommerell, Thorsten Gimmler, Andrea Meyer & Martina Hellmich) (Tagungshaus Drübberholz)
Paparazzo' (with Wolfgang Panning) (Abacus)Schwarzarbeit (with Andrea Meyer) (Bewitched)Wucherer'' (2F-Spiele) (also known as LandLord - Abacus / Rio Grande Games)

See also
 Going Cardboard (Documentary)

External links 
 
 2F-Spiele

Board game designers
1970 births
Businesspeople from Bremen
Living people